Jean-Claude Rabbath (born 12 July 1977 in Beirut) is a Lebanese high jumper.

He finished thirteenth at the 2005 Asian Championships, won the gold medal at the 2006 Asian Games and the silver medal at the 2007 Asian Championships. He also competed at the 1999 World Championships, the 2000 Olympic Games,  the 2004 Olympic Games and the 2005 World Championships without reaching the final round.

His personal best jump is 2.27 metres, achieved twice in April 2004 in Beirut and in June 2004 in Bucharest. Rabbath was also a basketball player and won many titles, including the Asian Championship with Sagesse SC.

Competition record

External links

1977 births
Living people
Lebanese high jumpers
Athletes (track and field) at the 2000 Summer Olympics
Athletes (track and field) at the 2004 Summer Olympics
Olympic athletes of Lebanon
Asian Games medalists in athletics (track and field)
Athletes (track and field) at the 1998 Asian Games
Athletes (track and field) at the 2002 Asian Games
Athletes (track and field) at the 2006 Asian Games
Athletes (track and field) at the 2010 Asian Games
Male high jumpers
Lebanese male athletes
Asian Games gold medalists for Lebanon
Medalists at the 2006 Asian Games
Athletes (track and field) at the 2005 Mediterranean Games
Mediterranean Games competitors for Lebanon